Martin in the Clouds (Martin u oblacima) is a 1961 Croatian film directed by Branko Bauer, starring Boris Dvornik and Ljubica Jović.

This movie established Boris Dvornik as a big star of former Yugoslav cinema, comparable to Ljubiša Samardžić, Milena Dravić, and Velimir "Bata" Živojinović (with whom he later developed a close friendship). In 1999, a poll of Croatian film critics found it to be one of the best Croatian films ever made.

Cast
 Boris Dvornik	...	Martin Baric
 Ljubica Jovic	...	Zorica
 Joza Seb	...	Vjenceslav Baric
 Antun Nalis	...	Carmine
 Braco Reiss	...	Robert Eugen Mrazek zvan Kliker
 Ljerka Prekratic	...	Marcella
 Lila Andres	...	Solarica (as Lila Anders)
 Nela Eržišnik	...	Prevarena zena
 Rikard Simonelli	...	Darko
 Vera Misita	...	Darkova Znanica
 Fahro Konjhodžić	...	Hrvoje
 Mato Petricic		
 Jozo Petricic	
 Josip Marotti	...	Projektant
 Sanda Fiderseg	...	Pazikuca

References

External links
 

1961 films
1960s Croatian-language films
Yugoslav comedy films
Films directed by Branko Bauer
Jadran Film films
Croatian black-and-white films